Red lobster may refer to:
California spiny lobster (Palinurus interruptus), a crustacean from the eastern Pacific Ocean
Eunephrops bairdii, a crustacean from the Caribbean Sea
Palinurus elephas, a crustacean from the eastern Atlantic Ocean and Mediterranean Sea
Red Lobster, an American restaurant chain

Animal common name disambiguation pages